Jeff Louis (born 8 August 1992) is a Haitian former professional footballer who played as a midfielder. Between 2011 and 2018 he represented the Haiti national team internationally, making 29 FIFA-official appearances and scoring 3 goals.

Club career
Louis spent his early career in Haiti and France with AS Mirebalais, Le Mans and Le Mans II. He signed for Nancy in July 2012. In May 2014 he was linked with a transfer to Scottish club Celtic. In August 2014 he signed for Belgian club Standard Liège. In July 2015 he signed with French club Caen. Often injured, he was rarely able to play. In September 2018, he was sentenced to three months in prison for traffic crime. After announcing his intention to end his career because of his knee injuries, he terminated his contract with Caen in November 2018.

International career
Louis made his international debut for the Haitian national football team in 2011, and he has appeared in FIFA World Cup qualifying matches for them.

International goals
Scores and results list Haiti's goal tally first, score column indicates score after each Louis goal.

Honors
Haiti
Caribbean Cup bronze: 2014

References

External links
 

1992 births
Living people
Sportspeople from Port-au-Prince
Association football midfielders
Haitian footballers
Haiti international footballers
AS Mirebalais players
AS Nancy Lorraine players
Le Mans FC players
Standard Liège players
Stade Malherbe Caen players
US Quevilly-Rouen Métropole players
Ligue Haïtienne players
Ligue 2 players
Ligue 1 players
Belgian Pro League players
Haitian expatriate footballers
Haitian expatriate sportspeople in France
Expatriate footballers in France
Haitian expatriate sportspeople in Belgium
Expatriate footballers in Belgium
2013 CONCACAF Gold Cup players
2014 Caribbean Cup players
2015 CONCACAF Gold Cup players
Copa América Centenario players